Daniel Tiger's Neighborhood (known as Daniel Tiger's Neighbourhood in the United Kingdom, Canada, Australia, and New Zealand, and often abbreviated to Daniel Tiger)  is a Flash animated  musical television series aimed at preschool children ages 2 to 4. 
It was produced by Fred Rogers Productions, 9 Story Media Group and 9 Story USA (which also produces Blue's Room and Super Why!). It debuted on September 3, 2012 on PBS Kids, eleven years after the end of production for Mister Rogers' Neighborhood and nine years after Fred Rogers' death. The program is based on the Neighborhood of Make-Believe from Mister Rogers, the long-running family-oriented television series created and hosted by Fred Rogers that aired from 1968 to 2001. In 2019, the series was renewed for a fifth season, which premiered on August 17, 2020 with Daniel Tiger's Neighborhood: Won't You Sing Along with Me?, a musical special that deals with the COVID-19 pandemic. On August 20, 2021, the series was renewed for a sixth season, which premiered on September 5, 2022. A one-hour television movie titled Daniel Visits a New Neighborhood aired on June 20, 2022.

Premise

The series centers around Daniel Tiger (son of Mom Tiger and Dad Tiger). The series also features other children of the characters from the Neighborhood of Make-Believe, such as Katerina Kittycat (daughter of Henrietta Pussycat), Miss Elaina (daughter of Lady Elaine Fairchilde and Music Man Stan), O the Owl (nephew of X the Owl) and Prince Wednesday (King Friday and Queen Sara Saturday's youngest son and Prince Tuesday's little brother). Two 11-minute segments are linked by a common socio-emotional theme, such as disappointment and sadness or anger and thankfulness. The theme also uses a musical motif phrase, which the show calls "strategy songs," to reinforce the theme and help children remember the life lessons. Many of the "strategy songs" are available in albums or as singles under the artist name "Daniel Tiger's Neighborhood." The program is targeted at preschool-aged children; it teaches emotional intelligence, kindness, and human respect. Its content follows a curriculum based on Fred Rogers' teaching and new research into child development.

Episodes

Characters
Characters from Daniel Tiger's Neighborhood include Daniel Tiger, his little sister Margaret and their parents Mr. and Mrs. Tiger. Teacher Harriet is his kindergarten teacher and his classmates are Miss Elaina, O the Owl, Katerina, and Prince Wednesday. They ride a semi-sentient trolley known as "Trolley" retaining the design from Mister Rogers.

Tiger family
 Daniel Tiger (voiced by Jake Beale from Season 1-Mid-Season 2, Devan Cohen from Mid-Season 2-3, Keegan Hedley in Seasons 4 & 5 and Asher Bolduc-Theron starting with "Daniel Tiger Visits a New Neighborhood") is a 5-year-old anthropomorphic tiger who lives on Jungle Beach with his parents. In season 2, he became an older brother when his younger sister Margaret was introduced. His favorite toy is a blue stuffed tiger named Tigey, which he named after "Tigey the Adventure Tiger," his favorite storybook hero. Daniel normally wears a red zipper cardigan sweater hoodie and red sneakers (in contrast to Mister Rogers' blue sneakers) and he often breaks the fourth wall by asking the viewers questions related to the content in the episodes. He differs in physical appearance from the Daniel Striped Tiger character in the Mr. Rogers' Neighborhood television show. In his house, the wardrobe and much of his home furnishings (such as the traffic light, shelves with the Neighborhood of Make-Believe models, the Neighborhood Trolley train set, and Picture Picture), are direct allusions to the Mr. Rogers studio house. He is allergic to peaches. His catchphrases are: "Grr-ific!" "Tiger-tastic!" "Ugga Mugga," "Wasn't that Grr-ific?" and "Grrrrrrrr!" He has been the mascot of Fred Rogers Productions since 2018.
 Margaret Tiger (voiced by Kira Gelineau) is Daniel's one-year-old sister who was introduced in Season 2. Her favorite toy is Pandy, a stuffed panda. She is named after Daniel's favorite baby book, "Margaret's Music", and her great-grandmother with the same name. She calls Daniel "Dan-Dan" and had a birthday party in episode 11 of season 4, "Margaret's Birthday Buddy" / "Margaret's Birthday Party".
 Mom Tiger (voiced by Heather Bambrick) is Daniel's mother, who works as a carpenter as of the first episode of season 4, "Daniel Finds Something to Do". In the first episode of season 2, she was pregnant and in the subsequent episode, she visited Dr. Anna and gave birth to Margaret. In Mister Rogers' Neighborhood, there was a "Collette Tiger" who referred to her grandfather (as Daniel does to his) as "grandpere".
 Dad Tiger (voiced by Ted Dykstra) is Daniel's father, who is a photographer and also works at the clock factory, where he maintains different clocks and is responsible for "chime time". He wears a blue cardigan sweater and blue sneakers. He is loosely based upon the Daniel Striped Tiger puppet from Mister Rogers' Neighborhood, a very shy orphan who lived inside a non-functioning grandfather clock. He mentions that he has a paternal grandmother named Margaret in the season 2 premiere.
 Grandpere Tiger (voiced by François Klanfer) is Daniel's grandfather ( being French for 'grandfather') who travels in his sailboat and has a French accent. He wears a blue pea coat and a blue beret. (The family tree in Daniel Tiger's Neighborhood diverges from that of Mister Rogers' Neighborhood, in which Grandpere was the grandfather of Collette, and Daniel Striped Tiger was an orphan.) In the season 2 premiere, he tells Daniel that his mother was named Margaret.

Owl family
 O the Owl (voiced by Zachary Bloch in early Season 1, Stuart Ralston from Mid-Season 1-2, Parker Lauzon in Season 3 and Benjamin Hum starting with Season 4) is a little blue owl with green sneakers who lives with his uncle, X, in the Treehouse, He loves books and has books about everything in his room. His catchphrases include "Hoo hoo!" and "Nifty galifty!"
 X the Owl (voiced by Tony Daniels) is O's uncle whose feathers are still the same dark blue color as they were in Mister Rogers' Neighborhood. He wears a green bowtie and brown loafers. He works at the neighborhood library. X's catchphrases are "How in the world are you?" and "Nifty galifty!"

Cat family
 Katerina Kittycat (voiced by Amariah Faulkner in Seasons 1-3, Jenna Weir in Seasons 4 & 5 and Maya Misaljevic starting with Season 6) is a cat and one of Daniel's classmates and lives with her mother, Henrietta Pussycat, in the treehouse and she loves dancing. She is O the Owl's next-door neighbor. Her catchphrase is "meow-meow." Her favorite toy is Penelope Pig.
 Henrietta Pussycat (voiced by Teresa Pavlinek) is Katerina's mother. She is a supporting character who shares her love of dancing with her daughter.

Royal family
 Prince Wednesday (voiced by Nicholas Kaegi in Season 1, Jaxon Mercey from Season 2-4 and Callum Shoniker starting with Season 5) is the Royal Family's youngest son who lives in the Castle. He is one of Daniel's four classmates and his best friend, has a rock collection and often pretends to be different animals. He frequently uses the adjective "royal" to refer to objects in his possession and says "Boop-she-boop-she-boo" when he is happy. His stuffed animals are Mr. Lizard, Sir Jumpy Frog, Bananas Monkey, and Polly Wolly Parrot.
 King Friday XIII (voiced by Jamie Watson) is the Ruler of the Neighborhood of Make-Believe, married to Queen Sara, has two sons—Prince Tuesday and Prince Wednesday—and is Chrissie's uncle. His arrival is often preceded by trumpet fanfare and he makes all the public announcements in the neighborhood. He enjoys bowling in his spare time, one of the rare instances he does not wear royal garb. He usually greets others with "Royal Greetings, royal greetings." He is a 2D animated model while his puppet model is voiced by Matt Vogel for Donkey Hodie.
 Queen Sara Saturday (voiced by Catherine Disher) is King Friday's wife, Prince Tuesday's and Prince Wednesday's mother and Chrissie's aunt. She is a supporting character, not seen as often as the other members of the royal family.
 Prince Tuesday (voiced by Tommy Lioutas) is Prince Wednesday's older brother, King Friday's heir apparent and Daniel Tiger's babysitter. He also works at the neighborhood restaurant as a waiter, at the market as a grocery clerk, a crossing guard near the school, as a lifeguard at the neighborhood pool and cleans Trolley. He went to college in the episode 'Prince Tuesday Goes to College'. However, he's back for a visit in the episode 'Prince Tuesday Visits'.
 Chrissie (voiced by Matilda Gilbert) is Prince Tuesday and Wednesday's cousin and King Friday and Queen Sara's niece. Her legs cannot work on their own, so she has to use braces on her legs and crutches on her arms. Occasionally, she needs some help, but mostly, she likes doing things for herself. She has a horse named Peaches. She also attends the neighborhood school. As a part of the Royal family, she would be princess of the family. She was introduced in ‘Daniel’s New Friend’. Chrissie is based on Chrissy Thompson, a regular visitor on Mister Rogers' Neighborhood.

Museum-Go-Round family
 Miss Elaina (voiced by Addison Holley in Seasons 1-4 and Markeda McKay starting with Season 5) enjoys doing things backwards and lives with her parents, Lady Elaine and Music Man Stan, in the Museum-Go-Round. She is one of Daniel's five classmates and often imagines space travel and robots. Her favorite toy is "Astrid the Astronaut" and her catchphrase is "Hiya, Toots!"
 Music Man Stan (voiced by Jeremiah Sparks) is Miss Elaina's father who owns the Neighborhood Music Shop, one of Daniel's favorite places to visit. He is also a firefighter with Dr. Anna and is in the musical duo "Bread and Jam" with Baker Aker. Music Man Stan is based on the actor Stanley Bennett Clay and his character he played on Christmastime with Mr. Rogers called The Music Man.
 Lady Elaine (voiced by Teresa Pavlinek) is Miss Elaina's mother who works at the crayon factory and is a curator of the Museum-Go-Round.

Platypus family
 Jodi Platypus (voiced by Laaibah Alvi) is a 4-year-old platypus who is shy around new acquaintances, but can be silly once she gets comfortable. She loves to play hide-and-seek and is resourceful, with a well-stocked pocket of supplies. Her catchphrase is: "Yippee Skippy!" Her favorite toy is Benji, a stuffed hedgehog. Jodi has asthma.
 Dr. Platypus (voiced by Miku Graham) is a mother to Jodi, Leo, and Teddy, and the daughter of Nana Platypus. Sometimes, she calls her daughter Jodi Jojo Bean. She works as the new neighborhood dentist. 
 Teddy Platypus (voiced by Bryn McAuley) is a 2-year-old twin to Leo and one of Jodi's younger brothers who is fast, rambunctious and loves to play hide-and-seek.
 Leo Platypus (voiced by Milo Torriel-Gibbon) is a 2-year-old twin to Teddy and one of Jodi's younger brothers who is careful and shy, but loves to cheer on his family.
 Nana Platypus (voiced by Elizabeth Hanna) is Jodi's grandmother who lives with her grandchildren Jodi, Teddy and Leo and works as a hairdresser.

Teacher Harriet's family
 Teacher Harriet (voiced by Shawne Jackson) is Daniel's kindergarten teacher. Her class consists of seven students: Daniel Tiger, Miss Elaina, Prince Wednesday, Princess Chrissie, O the Owl, Katerina Kittycat and Jodi Platypus. Teacher Harriet the human may be based on the Mister Rogers character Harriet Elizabeth Cow from the Neighborhood of Make-Believe, who appears in Donkey Hodie, another spin-off.
 Max (voiced by Israel Thomas-Bruce) is Teacher Harriet's autistic nephew.
 Amira (voiced by Mikaela Blake) is the niece of Teacher Harriet and Max's big sister.

Juan Carlos' family
 Juan Carlos (voiced by Desmond Sivan) is Daniel's pen pal and lives in another neighborhood than Daniel.
 Valentina is Mom Tiger's friend and Juan Carlos' mother.
 Felipe (voiced by Keram Malicki Sanchez) is Juan Carlos' father.

Other neighbors
 Baker Aker (voiced by John Filici) owns and runs the neighborhood bakery. He is Cuban, as he says in a 2016 segment called "A Visit with Baker Aker." He has baked pastries for Daniel and his family on many occasions and plays with Music Man Stan in Bread & Jam. He is based on the Mister Rogers character Chef Brockett and his name is an homage to Neighbor Aber, Charles R. Aber, of Mister Rogers' Neighborhood.
 Mr. McFeely (voiced by Derek McGrath) is the neighborhood mailman who is often on his bicycle delivering parcels and arrives and departs by saying "Speedy delivery!" He is the only human character from Mister Rogers' Neighborhood to be brought to Daniel Tiger's Neighborhood.
 Dr. Anna (voiced by Laara Sadiq) is the neighborhood physician; she is Indian. She assisted Mom Tiger give birth to Baby Margaret, got new eyeglasses for Prince Wednesday and has helped other characters with injuries or illnesses to recuperate. She is also a firefighter with Music Man Stan. She is allergic to peanuts. Though human, she shares several characteristics of the platypus family of Mister Rogers' Neighborhood: their patriarch, Bill Platypus, was the neighborhood physician and spoke with a foreign accent (Scottish, in his case) and his daughter was named Ana.
 Dr. Lee (voiced by Samantha Wan) is the doctor who helps Daniel Tiger with his surgery in the Season 5 episode "Daniel Goes to the Hospital."
 Trolley is a red, autonomous, semi-sentient trolley that transports Daniel and his friends anywhere in the Neighborhood of Make-Believe. It understands verbal commands clearly and replies by ringing its bell and blowing its whistle twice, which Daniel often imitates. It is the same trolley from Mister Rogers' Neighborhood.

Production
The series is co-produced by the Pittsburgh-based Fred Rogers Productions (formerly the Fred Rogers Company and Family Communications), New York City-based Out of the Blue Enterprises and with animation produced in Toronto by 9 Story Media Group with Adobe Animate (formerly Adobe Flash Professional) and music created at Voodoo Highway Music & Post.

Release and availability
In 2006, three years after Fred Rogers' death and after the end of production of Blue's Clues, The Fred Rogers Company contacted Angela Santomero to ask what type of show she would create to promote Rogers' legacy. That conversation led to the creation of Daniel Tiger's Neighborhood. PBS initially ordered 40 episodes, which were broadcast between September 3, 2012 and February 21, 2014. PBS Kids renewed the series for a second season of 20 episodes, which premiered on August 18, 2014. On July 7, 2015, the series was renewed for a third season of 25 episodes, which premiered on September 5, 2016. On October 11, 2017, the series was renewed for a fourth season of 20 episodes and a one-hour special Won't You Be Our Neighbor, which premiered on July 11, 2018. Cartoon Network UK's sister pre-school channel Cartoonito premiered Daniel Tiger's Neighborhood on March 1, 2016. The series had previously been available for streaming on Netflix before July 1, 2016, when a multi-year agreement for the catalog of many of PBS' children's series with Amazon Prime Video went into effect. A smaller selection of current episodes is also available through the PBS Kids app on several digital media player and tablet/smartphone platforms. It also now airs on international CBeebies channels around the world.

Awards and nominations
Daniel Tiger's Neighborhood has won and been nominated for several awards in children's broadcasting. It won Silver Parents' Choice Awards in 2013 and 2014, was nominated for the Television Critics' Association Award for Outstanding Achievement in Youth Programming in 2013 and 2014 and was a 2014 Prix Jeunesse International Selection. In 2019, it won the Daytime Emmy Award for Outstanding Pre-School Children's Animated Program.

References

External links
 
 

2010s American animated television series
2020s American animated television series
2010s American children's television series
2020s American children's television series
2010s Canadian animated television series
2020s Canadian animated television series
2010s Canadian children's television series
2020s Canadian children's television series
2010s preschool education television series
2020s preschool education television series
2012 American television series debuts
2012 Canadian television series debuts
American animated television spin-offs
American children's animated television series
American flash animated television series
American preschool education television series
Animated preschool education television series
American television series with live action and animation
Canadian animated television spin-offs
Canadian children's animated television series
Canadian flash animated television series
Canadian preschool education television series
Canadian television series with live action and animation
English-language television shows
Mister Rogers' Neighborhood
Personal development television series
PBS Kids shows
PBS original programming
Family Jr. original programming
Treehouse TV original programming
Animated television series about children
Animated television series about families
Television series about tigers
Television series by 9 Story Media Group
Television series by Brown Bag Films
Television series created by Angela Santomero
Television shows set in Pittsburgh
Television shows filmed in Pittsburgh
Television shows filmed in New York City
Television shows filmed in Toronto